Chalicotherium (Ancient Greek /, -: pebble/gravel + /, diminutive of / : beast) is a genus of extinct odd-toed ungulates of the order Perissodactyla and family Chalicotheriidae. The genus is known from Europe and Asia, from the Middle Miocene to Late Miocene.

This animal would look much like other chalicotheriid species: an odd-looking herbivore with long clawed forelimbs and stouter weight-bearing hindlimbs.

The type species, Chalicotherium goldfussi, from Late Miocene Europe, was described by Johann Jakob Kaup in 1833. When the French naturalist George Cuvier first received a cleft claw from Eppelheim, Germany, he identified it as the toe bone of a gigantic pangolin.

Description
Chalicotherium, like many members of Perissodactyla, was adapted to browsing, though the chalicotheres were uniquely adapted to do so among ungulates. Its arms were long and heavily clawed, allowing them to walk on their knuckles only. The arms were used to reach for the branches of large trees and bring them close to its long head to strip them clean of leaves. The horse-like head itself shows adaptation to a diet of soft vegetation, since, as the animal reached sexual maturity, the incisors and upper canines were shed, suggesting that its muscular lips and the resulting gum pads were enough to crop fodder which was then processed by squarish, low-crowned molars.

Callosities on the ischium imply that these animals would sit on their haunches for extended periods of time, probably while feeding. Pad-supporting bony growth on the dorsal side of the manual phalanges is interpreted as evidence of knuckle-walking, which would probably be useful to avoid wearing down the claws, preserving them for use either as a forage-collecting rake or as a formidable defensive weapon, or both.

All of these characteristics show some convergence with such other creatures as ground sloths, great apes, bears (especially giant pandas), and a group of theropod dinosaurs known as therizinosaurs.

Classification

Taxonomic history

The type specimens for Chalicotherium goldfussi were found in the Upper Miocene strata of the Dinotherien-sande beds near Eppelsheim, in the Grand Duchy of Hesse, Germany. Johann Jakob Kaup, when describing this new animal in 1833, found the teeth to be pebble-like and named the creature accordingly. Later on, limbs found in strata located at Sansan in the department of Gers, Southwestern France, were first described as Macrotherium by Édouard Lartet in 1837. Further study of these fossil remains and subsequent finds by Filhol warranted a referral of the material described as Macrotherium to Chalicotherium.

Referral history for each species is detailed in the species list below along with morphological and geographical data where available.

Species
Valid:
 Chalicotherium goldfussi J. J. Kaup, 1833.
The type species, it was found in Upper Miocene beds located in Germany. It weighed around 1500 kg and was 2.6 m high at the shoulder.
 Chalicotherium brevirostris Colbert, 1934
First described as Macrotherium brevirostris, this species hails from the Upper Miocene Tung Gur Formation, Inner Mongolia, China.

Invalid:
 Chalicotherium antiquum J. J. Kaup, 1833.
Found at the same locality as the type species, it was later found wanting of diagnostic features and sunk into the type species.

Misassigned specimens:
 Chalicotherium cf. C. brevirostris Wang et al., 2001.
Hailing for the Tsaidam Basin, northern Qinghai-Tibetan Plateau, China.
 "Chalicotherium modicum" Stehlin, 1905.
A nomen nudum, actually a Schizotherium priscum tooth.
 "Chalicotherium" bilobatum Cope.
Hailing from the Oligocene of Saskatchewan, this very fragmentary specimen was the type on which Russel erected the genus Oreinotherium.
 Chalicotherium spp.
Specimens found in two Tajikistan localities, thought to pertain to at least two different species.

See also

 Moropus

References

 Grande Enciclopédia Portuguesa e Brasileira, vol. 5. (1936-1960). Editorial Enciclopédia, Lda, Lisbon.
 Chalicotherium at Atlas Virtual da Pré-História. Retrieved 22 March 2007.
 Butler, P. M., 1978: Chalicotheriidae. 368–370. in Maglio, V. J. & Cooke, H. B. S., (eds.) 1978: Evolution of African mammals. – Harvard University Press, Cambridge, Massachusetts & London, England, 1978, xiv-641
 Carroll, R. L., 1988: Vertebrate paleontology and evolution. – W. H. Freeman and company, New York, 1988, 698.
 Carroll, R. L., 1988: Appendix. 594–648. in Carroll, R. L., 1988: Vertebrate paleontology and evolution. – W. H. Freeman and company, New York, 1988, 698.
 Coombs, M. C., 1989: Interrelationships and diversity in the Chalicotheriidae. 438–457. in Prothero, D. R. & Schoch, R. M., (eds.) 1989: The Evolution of Perissodactyls. – Oxford University Press, New York, New York & Oxford, England, 1989, ix-537
 Coombs, M. C., Hunt, Jr, R. M., Stepleton, E., Albright III, L. B. & Fremd, T. J., 2001: Stratigraphy, chronology, biogeography, and taxonomy of Early Miocene small chalicotheres in North America. – Journal of Vertebrate Paleontology: Vol. 21, #3, pp. 607–620
 Geraads, D., Spassov, N. & Kovachev, D., 2001: New Chalicotheriidae (Perissodactyla, Mammalia) from the Late Miocene of Bulgaria. – Journal of Vertebrate Paleontology: Vol. 21, #3, pp. 569–606
 Hooker, J. J. & Dashzeveg, D., 2004: The origin of chalicotheres (Perissodactyla, Mammalia) – Palaeontology: Vol. 47, #6, pp. 1363–1386
 Lucas, S. G. & Schoch, R. M., 1989: Taxonomy and biochronology of Eomoropus and Grangeria, Eocene chalicotheres from the western United States and China. 422–437. in Prothero, D. R. & Schoch, R. M., (eds.) 1989: The Evolution of Perissodactyls. – Oxford University Press, New York, New York & Oxford, England, 1989, ix-537
 McKenna, M. C. & Bell, S. K., (eds.) 1997: Classification of mammals – above the species level. – Columbia University Press, New York, 1997, xii-631
 Prothero, D. R. & Schoch, R. M., 1989: Classification of the Perissodactyla. 530–537. in Prothero, D. R. & Schoch, R. M., (eds.) 1989: The Evolution of Perissodactyls. – Oxford University Press, New York, New York & Oxford, England, 1989, ix-537
 Remy, J.-A., Jaeger, J.-J., Chaimanee, Y., Soe, U. A. N., Marivaux, L., Sudre, J., Tun, S. T., Marandat, B. & Dewaele, E., 2005: A new chalicothere from the Pondaung Formation (late Middle Eocene) of Myanmar. – Comptes Rendus de l'Académie des Sciencies, Paris: Palevol: Vol. 4, pp. 341–349
 The America Heritage Dictionary of English Language. 2004, 2000. Houghton Mifflin Company.
 
 Wang, Xiaoming; Wang, Banyue (2001): New material of Chalicotherium from the Tsaidam Basin in the northern Qinghai-Tibetan Plateau, China. Paläontologische Zeitschrift, Vol 75, Fascicle 2. Pages 219–226.
 Margery Chalifoux Coombs. Additional Schizotherium material from China, and a review of Schizotherium dentitions (Perissodactyla, Chalicotheriidae). April 24, 1978. American Museum Novitates nr 2647. pages 1-18. The American Museum Of Natural History. New York City, N. Y.
 Edwin H. Colbert. Distributional and phylogenetic studies on Indian fossil mammals. III – A classification of the Chalicotherioidea. May 8, 1935 American Museum Novitates nr 798, 56.9 (54). The American Museum Of Natural History. New York City.
 www.angellis.net/Web/PDfiles/ungperis.pdf

Chalicotheres
Miocene odd-toed ungulates
Zanclean extinctions
Neogene mammals of Europe
Cenozoic mammals of Africa
Fossil taxa described in 1833